Byggnadsarbetaren (Swedish: Construction Workers) is the official magazine of the builders union. The magazine was established in 1949. It is published eight times a year and based in Stockholm, Sweden. As of 2015 Kenneth Pettersson was the editor-in-chief of the magazine.

In 2012 the circulation of Byggnadsarbetaren was 108,300 copies.

References

External links
 

1949 establishments in Sweden
Eight times annually magazines
Magazines established in 1949
Magazines published in Stockholm
Professional and trade magazines
Swedish-language magazines